Nelson Zamora (born 5 April 1959) is a Uruguayan long-distance runner. He competed in the men's marathon at the 1992 Summer Olympics.

References

1959 births
Living people
Athletes (track and field) at the 1987 Pan American Games
Athletes (track and field) at the 1992 Summer Olympics
Uruguayan male long-distance runners
Uruguayan male marathon runners
Olympic athletes of Uruguay
Place of birth missing (living people)
Pan American Games competitors for Uruguay